The Col de Val Louron-Azet (or Col d'Azet) (elevation ) is a mountain pass in the French Pyrenees in the department of Hautes-Pyrénées,  which links Saint-Lary-Soulan and Azet, in the Aure Valley to the west, with Génos and Loudenvielle in the Louron Valley to the east. To the east of the pass is the Val-Louron ski station, and the GR10 footpath is also nearby.

Details of climb

Appearances in Tour de France
The Col de Val Louron-Azet was first used in the Tour de France in 1997, since when it has featured ten times, most recently in 2022.

References

External links
Profile from Génos
Profile from Bazus-Aure

Mountain passes of Hautes-Pyrénées
Mountain passes of the Pyrenees